Frankie Edroff (formerly Jeneece Edroff  born January 20, 1994) is a Canadian philanthropist who has fundraised over a million dollars for Variety, the Children's Charity. He was inducted into the Terry Fox Hall of Fame in 2006 and awarded with multiple medals including the Queen Elizabeth II Diamond Jubilee Medal in 2012.

Early life and education
Edroff was born on January 21, 1994, in Victoria, British Columbia. When he was three years old, Edroff was diagnosed with neurofibromatosis. At the age of seven, he started a penny drive to raise money for Variety, the Children's Charity. He went to Claremont Secondary School in Victoria and completed a food course at the Camosun College in December 2014.

Career
Throughout his childhood, Edroff has raised over a million dollars for Variety. In 2009, Edroff was a torch bearer and lit the Olympic cauldron at the British Columbia Parliament Buildings for the 2010 Winter Olympics. In 2012, Jeneece Place at the Victoria General Hospital was opened for Edroff's eighteenth birthday. Edroff opened Jeneece Place to provide short-term housing for families of Victoria, British Columbia when their children undergo medical treatments.

Awards and honours
Edroff was inducted into the Terry Fox Hall of Fame in 2006 and awarded the Order of British Columbia in 2010. Other awards Edroff was presented with include the Queen Elizabeth II Diamond Jubilee Medal in 2012 and the Meritorious Service Cross in 2016 for civil work.

Personal life
In 2012, Edroff went for a medical consultation at the Mayo Clinic for his spine and leg. Edroff had previous surgeries at the British Columbia Children's Hospital when he was young. In 2018, he came out as a transgender man and is now using the name Frankie. In 2019, a documentary about Edroff's gender transitioning was released.

References

1994 births
Living people
21st-century Canadian LGBT people
Members of the Order of British Columbia
People from Victoria, British Columbia
Canadian Disability Hall of Fame
Transgender men
Canadian philanthropists
Camosun College alumni